Ernst August Moritz von Froelich (13 January 1787-25 October 1858) was an officer in the Prussian Army during the French Revolutionary Wars and the Napoleonic Wars, rising to lieutenant general and commander of 3rd Cavalry Brigade. He was born in Medzibor-Neu Mittelwalde in the Duchy of Oels and died in Schmiedeberg im Riesengebirge.

Bibliography (in German) 
 Kurt von Priesdorff: Soldatisches Führertum. Hanseatische Verlagsanstalt, Hamburg, Nr.1573, Band 5, S. 323–235
 Ernst Heinrich Kneschke, Neues allgemeines deutsches Adels-Lexicon, Band 3, S.374
 Zeitschrift für Kunst, Wissenschaft, und Geschichte des Krieges, Band 105, S.227ff Nekrolog
 Berliner Revue, Band 16, S.328f Nekrolog

Prussian Army personnel
German military leaders of the French Revolutionary Wars
German commanders of the Napoleonic Wars
1787 births
1858 deaths